Caroline Barry is an American actress who lives in Los Angeles.

Life and career 
Caroline Barry was born and raised in Colorado Springs, Colorado. She graduated from the University of Colorado, where she studied acting. After graduation, Barry relocated to Los Angeles to pursue a career in acting.

She landed the lead role of Nellie Bly in the biographical film 10 Days in a Madhouse (2015).

Filmography

References

External links
 
 Caroline Barry on Twitter
 
 Caroline Barry on YouTube
 Caroline Barry on Instagram

American actresses
Living people
Year of birth missing (living people)
21st-century American women